Odo ( or Odon, ; c. 1010 – 10 March 1039/1040) was Duke of Gascony from 1032 and then Duke of Aquitaine and Count of Poitou from 1038.

He was a member of the House of Poitiers, the second son of William V of Aquitaine, the eldest by his second wife Brisca, daughter of William II of Gascony.

The Chronicle of Saint-Maixent and Adhemar of Chabannes are the chief sources for his reign. He was subscribing donation charters to Saint-Cyprien with his father and mother and his brother Theobald, who died young, before 1018. He inherited Gascony in 1032 after the death of his uncle Sancho VI. In 1033, Odo took possession of the County of Bordeaux, traditional seat of the Gascon dukes.

At the death of his half-brother William VI in 1038, he succeeded as Duke of Aquitaine and Count of Poitou. However, he was killed while asserting his rights in Poitou against his stepmother Agnes and his half-brother William VII. He died in battle at Mauzé defending his recently acquired title there. He was buried in the abbey of Saint-Pierre at Maillezais beside his father and brother.

See also
Dukes of Aquitaine family tree

Notes

References

Sources

|-

|-

Dukes of Aquitaine
Dukes of Gascony
Counts of Poitiers
Burials at Maillezais Abbey
1010s births
1039 deaths
Military personnel killed in action